Flakavatnet is an alpine lake on the border of Vestland and Viken counties in Norway. The  lake lies in the municipalities of Ulvik (in Vestland) and Hol (in Viken) and the lake lies entirely within the Hallingskarvet National Park.

The lake is one of the largest lakes in Europe that lies in the transition to the high-alpine zone, where vegetation is minimal or absent and influence of permanent snow patches and glaciers are evident.

See also
List of lakes in Norway

References

Lakes of Vestland
Lakes of Viken (county)
Ulvik
Hol